The Woman I Stole is a 1933 American pre-Code adventure film directed by Irving Cummings, starring Jack Holt, Fay Wray and Donald Cook. It is based on the novel Tampico by Joseph Hergesheimer, with the setting shifted from Mexico to North Africa.

Main cast
 Jack Holt as Jim Bradler  
 Fay Wray as Vida Carew  
 Donald Cook as Corew  
 Noah Beery Sr. as Gen. Rayon  
 Raquel Torres as Teresita  
 Edwin Maxwell as Lentz  
 Charles A. Browne as Deleker

Critical reception
A contemporary review in Variety described the film as "[f]actory product, but factory product of a successful kind," and noted that the film's [i]ntent is melodramatic, but the treatment is particularly smooth and innocent of overdone heroics without sacrifice of action" and that the "acting is engaging in its simplicity." Writing in The New York Times, movie critic Andre Sennwald described the film as "a melodrama of definite interest," "a beguiling adventure" with a narrative that is "told with color, speed and reticence," and having a conclusion in which "Fay Wray cool[s] her sinful heels on a distant pier while the two men who perilously avoided her net plan to celebrate their good fortune in a quart of brandy."

References

Bibliography
 Roy Kinnard & Tony Crnkovich. The Films of Fay Wray. McFarland, 2013.

External links
 

1933 films
1933 adventure films
1930s English-language films
American adventure films
Films directed by Irving Cummings
Films with screenplays by Jo Swerling
Columbia Pictures films
American black-and-white films
1930s American films